Evelin Jahl ( Schlaak and later Herberg, born 28 March 1956 in Annaberg-Buchholz, Saxony, East Germany) is a German former discus thrower, who won two Olympic gold medals representing East Germany.

In 1976 she won the women's discus throwing event at the Montreal Summer Olympics defeating favourite and world record holder Faina Melnik. In 1978 she set a new world record and also won the European Championships. Two years later Jahl defended the Olympic title in Moscow, again relegating Vergova, also competing under her married name (Petkova), into second place. From 1980 until 2016 Jahl was the only discus thrower to defend her Olympic title and win two Olympic gold medals. Her feat was equalled by Sandra Perković of Croatia at the 2016 Summer Olympics in Rio de Janeiro.

She retired from throwing in 1982 after an injury. She later became GDR chairperson of a commission in the GDR track and field association DVfL.

After the 1976 Olympics she married shot putter Norbert Jahl und competed under her married name for the rest of her sporting career. Shortly after her retirement, she married the swim trainer Harald Herberg but she soon divorced him.

References

 Schlaak-Jahl-Herberg rzutyiskoki.pl 

1956 births
Living people
People from Annaberg-Buchholz
East German female discus throwers
Olympic athletes of East Germany
Athletes (track and field) at the 1976 Summer Olympics
Athletes (track and field) at the 1980 Summer Olympics
World record setters in athletics (track and field)
European Athletics Championships medalists
Medalists at the 1980 Summer Olympics
Medalists at the 1976 Summer Olympics
Olympic gold medalists for East Germany
Olympic gold medalists in athletics (track and field)
Universiade medalists in athletics (track and field)
People of the Stasi
East German women
Universiade silver medalists for East Germany
Medalists at the 1979 Summer Universiade
Sportspeople from Saxony